The 2001 Trans America Athletic Conference men's basketball tournament (now known as the ASUN men's basketball tournament) was held February 28 – March 3 at the GSU Sports Arena in Atlanta, Georgia. This was the final tournament before the TAAC changed its name to its current moniker, the Atlantic Sun.

Top-seeded  defeated  in the championship game, 79–55, to win their second TAAC/Atlantic Sun men's basketball tournament.

The Panthers, therefore, received the TAAC's automatic bid to the 2001 NCAA tournament.

Format
With no teams joining or leaving the conference, the field remained set at ten. All teams were eligible for the tournament, seeded based on their conference records.

Bracket

References

ASUN men's basketball tournament
Tournament
TAAC men's basketball tournament
TAAC men's basketball tournament
TAAC men's basketball tournament